NFPA 70B (Recommended Practice for Electrical Equipment Maintenance) is a standard of the National Fire Protection Association that addresses recommended electrical equipment maintenance.
NFPA 70B is part of NFPA 70.

Purpose

This recommended practice applies to preventive maintenance for electrical, electronic, and communication systems and equipment and is not intended to duplicate or supersede instructions that manufacturers normally provide. Systems and equipment covered are typical of those installed in industrial plants, institutional and commercial buildings, and large multifamily residential complexes.

Related NFPA standards 

 NFPA 70 — National Electrical Code (NEC)
 NFPA 70E — Standard for Electrical Safety in the Workplace

External links 

 NFPA 70B: Recommended Practice for Electrical Equipment Maintenance

Firefighting in the United States
Safety codes
Safety organizations
Electrical standards
NFPA Standards